Isabel Duval de Navarre (born 25 June 1956) is a German figure skating coach, ISU technical specialist, and former competitor for West Germany. She is the 1975 German national champion and placed fifth at the 1976 Winter Olympics.

Personal life
Isabel de Navarre was born on 25 June 1956 in Bad Tölz, Bavaria. She is eight years younger than her sister, Yvonne.

Career
Isabel de Navarre started to skate at the age of three at an ice rink in Bad Tölz which did not have a roof at the time. She wanted to compete with her sister, Yvonne, who placed seventh at the 1969 German Championships. She was also strongly inspired by figure skaters like Mona and Peter Szabo (Switzerland), Günter Anderl (Austria), Manfred Schnelldorfer, Gudrun Hauss and Walter Häffner (all West Germany) at the summer training camp in Bad Tölz.

De Navarre trained at Eisclub Bad Tölz under Trude Bacherer from Vienna. In 1970–71, she took her coach's advice to move to Garmisch-Partenkirchen and train with Erich Zeller, who coached her to the end of her amateur career. She finished 14th at the 1972 Winter Olympics in Sapporo, Japan.

From 1972, de Navarre represented Sportclub Riessersee. She won the 1975 German national ladies' title and finished fifth at the 1976 Winter Olympics in Innsbruck, Austria. She ranked first in the compulsory figures, 11th in the short program, and 12th in the free skate.

De Navarre is an International Skating Union technical specialist. She is a Diplom-qualified figure skating coach.

Results

References

External links 
 

1956 births
Living people
German female single skaters
Figure skaters at the 1972 Winter Olympics
Figure skaters at the 1976 Winter Olympics
Olympic figure skaters of West Germany
International Skating Union technical specialists
People from Bad Tölz
Sportspeople from Upper Bavaria